The Second National Bank is a historic structure located in Downtown Washington, D.C.  It was listed on the National Register of Historic Places in 1994.

History
The bank was organized in 1872 and this building served as its second headquarters.  It was designed by Washington architect Appleton P. Clark Jr. in the Italian Renaissance Revival style and was built from 1927 to 1928.   The banking room was on the main floor of the building and it had rental office space above.

Architect
The building is an example of the flattened neoclassicism that was popular in the 1920s.  The exterior of the building is faced with limestone and features bronze infills.

References

External links

Commercial buildings completed in 1928
Renaissance Revival architecture in Washington, D.C.
Bank buildings on the National Register of Historic Places in Washington, D.C.
1928 establishments in Washington, D.C.